|}

This is a list of electoral district results for the Victorian 1940 election.

Results by electoral district

Albert Park

Allandale 

 Two party preferred vote was estimated.

Ballarat

Barwon

Benalla

Benambra

Bendigo

Boroondara

Brighton 

 Preferences were not distributed.

Brunswick

Bulla and Dalhousie

Carlton 

 Two party preferred vote was estimated.

Castlemaine and Kyneton

Caulfield

Clifton Hill

Coburg

Collingwood 

 Two candidate preferred vote was estimated.

Dandenong

Dundas

Essendon

Evelyn

Flemington

Footscray

Geelong

Gippsland East

Gippsland North

Gippsland South

Gippsland West 

 Preferences were not distributed.

Goulburn Valley

Grant

Gunbower

Hampden

Hawthorn

Heidelberg

Kara Kara and Borung 

 Two candidate preferred vote was estimated.

Kew

Korong and Eaglehawk

Lowan 

 Two candidate preferred vote was estimated.

Maryborough and Daylesford

Melbourne

Mildura

Mornington

Northcote

Nunawading

Oakleigh

Ouyen

Polwarth

Port Fairy and Glenelg 

 Ernie Bond had been elected as an Independent in 1937 and joined the Labor party before the election.

Port Melbourne

Prahran

Richmond

Rodney

St Kilda

Stawell and Ararat

Swan Hill 

 Preferences were not distributed.

Toorak

Upper Goulburn

Upper Yarra

Walhalla

Wangaratta and Ovens

Waranga

Warrenheip and Grenville 

 Two candidate preferred vote was estimated.

Warrnambool

Williamstown

Wonthaggi

See also 

 1940 Victorian state election
 Candidates of the 1940 Victorian state election
 Members of the Victorian Legislative Assembly, 1940–1943

References 

Results of Victorian state elections
1940s in Victoria (Australia)